In the 2001–02 season, English professional football (soccer) club Newcastle United F.C. played in the Premier League, finishing fourth.

Season summary
For Bobby Robson's first two seasons as manager, the club remained in the bottom half of the table, however during this period Robson had built up an exciting young squad. He felt that his side could aim for eighth place in the final table as the season began

Newcastle reached an Inter-Toto Cup final early in the season against Troyes AC, which they lost on away goals after a 4–4 draw at home. They were soon looking like unlikely contenders for the Premiership title. Players such as Kieron Dyer (a Ruud Gullit signing), Craig Bellamy and Laurent Robert ensured the team were capable of once again punching their weight in the league. Newcastle achieved qualification for the lucrative Champions' League finishing in 4th place.

This brought renewed hope for the club after four seasons of struggle, though in the end Newcastle fell short of winning the title that they had coveted since 1927. Nonetheless, fourth place was their highest since 1997, securing Champions League football for only the second time in the club's history.

Final league table

Club transfers

In

 Total spending:  £21m

Out

 Total spending:  £0.15m

Players

First-team squad

Reserve squad
The following players did not appear for the first-team this season.

U-19 squad
The following players made most of their appearances for the under-19 team this season, but may have also appeared for the under-17s or the reserves.

U-17 squad
The following players made most of their appearances for the under-17 team this season, but may have appeared for the under-19s or the reserves.

Trialists

Other players

Coaching staff

Appearances, goals and cards
(Starting appearances + substitute appearances)

Matches

Pre-season

Intertoto Cup

Rob Lee Testimonial

Premier League

FA Cup

League Cup

References

External links
FootballSquads - Newcastle United - 2001/02
Newcastle United transfers under Bobby Robson
Newcastle United Football Club - Fixtures 2001-02
Newcastle - Player Appearances - Soccerbase

Newcastle United F.C. seasons
Newcastle United